Pierre Chan (born 18 August 1976) is a Hong Kong medical doctor and politician. Chan was elected in the 2016 Hong Kong Legislative Council election through the Medical functional constituency.

Early life 
Chan was born in Hong Kong in 1976.

Education 
In 2000, Chan graduated with a medical degree from the University of Hong Kong.

Career 
In 2001, Chan started his career at the Queen Mary Hospital until 2010. Chan joined Ruttonjee Hospital as an associate consultant of gastroenterology and hepatology.

In 2014, Chan became president of the doctors' union, the Hong Kong Public Doctors' Association, until 2016. In 2014, Chan was appointed by the government to several public boards, including the Steering Committee on Review of the Hospital Authority until 2015. In 2016, Chan became a member of the Medical Council of Hong Kong.

He was elected in the 2016 Hong Kong Legislative Council election through the Medical functional constituency.

References

External links 
 drchanpierre.org
 Pierre Chan at hongkongfp.com
 Chan is a contributor in colorectal cancer at guwsmedical.info
 Pierre Chan on foreign doctor working in HK at rthk.hk
 Chan on hospital patients (injured protesters) data given to police

1976 births
Alumni of the University of Hong Kong
Living people
Hong Kong medical doctors
HK LegCo Members 2016–2021